"Sitting on Top of the World" was a single released by the English football team Liverpool on 28 April 1986. It reached number 50 in the UK Singles Chart.

References

1986 singles
Liverpool F.C. songs
Football songs and chants
1986 songs